Calici may refer to:
Čalići, a village in Bosnia and Herzegovina
Caliciviridae, a family of viruses
Limping calici, a disease of kittens